In Ohio, State Route 40 may refer to:
U.S. Route 40 in Ohio, the only Ohio highway numbered 40 since 1927
Ohio State Route 40 (1923-1927), now US 22 (Washington Court House to Zanesville)

40